Karolina Karasiewicz (born 23 July 1992) is a Polish professional racing cyclist. In June 2017, she won the Polish National Road Race Championships. In June 2019, at the European Games in Minsk, Karasiewicz won a bronze medal in the team pursuit event.

References

1992 births
Living people
Polish female cyclists
Sportspeople from Łódź
Cyclists at the 2019 European Games
European Games medalists in cycling
European Games bronze medalists for Poland
21st-century Polish women